Robert Anthony Stoops (born September 9, 1960) is an American football coach who is the head coach for the Arlington Renegades. He was the head football coach at the University of Oklahoma from 1999 through the 2016 season, and on an interim basis during the 2021 Alamo Bowl. He led the Oklahoma Sooners to a record of 191–48 over his career. His 2000 Oklahoma Sooners football team won the 2001 Orange Bowl, which served as the BCS National Championship Game, and earned a consensus national championship. Since 2020, Stoops has been a head coach with the XFL, coaching the Arlington Renegades in 2020 and has been re-signed for 2023.

Stoops played college football at the University of Iowa as a defensive back from 1979 to 1982. Prior to his tenure at Oklahoma, he held various assistant coaching positions at the University of Iowa, Kent State University, Kansas State University, and the University of Florida. Stoops was awarded the Paul "Bear" Bryant Award in 2000 and the Walter Camp Coach of the Year Award in both 2000 and 2003. Stoops has been nicknamed "Big Game Bob" by both supporters and detractors.

Stoops was inducted into the College Football Hall of Fame as a coach in 2021.

High school and college
Stoops is one of six children born to Ron Sr. and Evelyn "Dee Dee" Stoops in Youngstown, Ohio. He is a 1978 graduate of Cardinal Mooney High School, where his father was the long-time defensive coordinator of the football team. Bob and his three brothers (Ron Jr., Mike, and Mark) were all coached by Ron Sr. at Mooney. During a game in 1988 against the team coached by Ron Jr., Ron Sr. began experiencing chest pains. He was placed in an ambulance following the game and died en route to the hospital.

While at Iowa, Stoops was a four-year starter, and one-time All-Big Ten selection at defensive back at the University of Iowa. He was named Team MVP in 1982.

Coaching career

Assistant coach
After graduating with a marketing degree in 1983, Stoops began his coaching career as a volunteer coach and graduate assistant in the Iowa Hawkeyes program under Hayden Fry. He next was an assistant at Kent State University under Dick Crum in 1988, and then joined the coaching staff at Kansas State University the following year. Stoops was named co-defensive coordinator at Kansas State under Bill Snyder in 1991 and assistant head coach and co-defensive coordinator in 1995. During his tenure on the Wildcats staff, Stoops played a key role in their impressive turnaround, helping take what many considered to be the worst program in Division I-A to national contention. During his final four seasons there, Kansas State was 35–12 with three bowl appearances.

Stoops then left for the University of Florida, serving three years as Steve Spurrier's defensive coordinator. Hired after Florida allowed 62 points to Nebraska in the 1996 Fiesta Bowl, he was granted authority over the Gators defense; the team responded by winning the national championship over Florida State in the 1997 Sugar Bowl.

Due to his success leading defenses at Kansas State and Florida, Stoops was mentioned as a future head coach.

Oklahoma

The University of Oklahoma named Stoops its head coach in 1999. OU won seven games in Stoops' first year, taking the Sooners to their first bowl game since the 1994 season.

In his 18 years as head coach of the Sooners, Stoops had a combined record of 190–48. On November 16, 2013, Stoops notched his 157th win as Oklahoma's head coach with a victory over Iowa State, tying him with Barry Switzer for the most wins in Sooners history. A week later, on November 23, 2013, he surpassed Switzer's record with a 41–31 victory over Kansas State. Stoops accumulated a home winning streak of 39 consecutive games from 2005 to 2011. The streak was ended on October 22, 2011 when Texas Tech defeated Oklahoma 41–38. He also had the most wins of the decade of any BCS school with 110 (2000–2009). Along with Switzer, Bud Wilkinson and Bennie Owen, he is one of four coaches to win over 100 games at the University of Oklahoma; no other college football program has had more than three coaches accomplish such a feat. Overall, Oklahoma was 4–6 in BCS games and 9–9 in bowl games under Stoops. Stoops, along with Bill Snyder of Kansas State, were among the first to use the JUCO systems of their respective states to help their programs progress.

Stoops led the Sooners to the 2000 BCS National Championship and finished the season undefeated, outscoring thirteen opponents by a combined 481–194. His Oklahoma teams again earned the opportunity to play in the BCS National Championship Game in 2004, 2005 and 2009, losing to LSU, 21–14, in the 2004 Sugar Bowl, and to USC, 55–19 in the 2005 Orange Bowl, and Florida, 24–14, in the 2009 BCS National Championship Game. Under Stoops, Oklahoma had four BCS National Championship Game appearances, a record shared with Florida State.

Stoops' teams finished the season ranked in the Top 10 of the polls for 11 of his 18 seasons, seven times finishing in the top five.

Stoops led his team to bowl games in each of his 17 years at Oklahoma, ten of which were Bowl Championship Series (BCS) bowls, including the Big 12 Conference's first Rose Bowl victory as the Sooners upended Washington State, 34–14, in the 2003 Rose Bowl. With Oklahoma's victory over Alabama at the 2014 Sugar Bowl, Stoops became the first and only coach to win all four BCS bowl games and a BCS National Championship.

Stoops' penchant for winning big games early in his career earned him the nickname "Big Game Bob", From 1999 to 2003, Oklahoma under Stoops was 18–2 (0.900) vs. ranked opponents and 3–1 (0.750) in bowl games, with one national title and three Big 12 titles.

Late in the 2003 season, however, Bob's brother Mike Stoops left his position of defensive coordinator and associate head coach at Oklahoma to accept the head coaching job at Arizona. The Sooners promptly lost two games in a row against ranked teams after Mike's departure that season (a 35–7 loss against #13 Kansas State in the Big 12 Title Game, and a 21–14 loss to #3 LSU in the BCS National Title Game). Since then (2004–2016), Stoops' teams went 17–13 vs. ranked opponents, and 3–4 in Bowl Games with no National Titles (although they played for 3 more), and five Big 12 Titles. Stoops' teams did finish with two Heisman Trophy winners during this time, however, and two runners-up.

Under Stoops, the Sooners won ten Big 12 Conference championships, the most of any Big 12 team. Oklahoma is also the only Big 12 team to win back-to-back-to-back Big 12 championships. Stoops posted a 121-29 (.807) conference record during his career, and was named the Big 12 Coach of the Year six times.

In his 18 seasons as Sooners' head coach, Stoops was 11–7 against the Texas Longhorns in the Red River Rivalry. During a five-game winning streak in that rivalry from 2000 to 2004, his Sooners handed the Longhorns two of their worst defeats in school history, 63–14 in 2000 and 65–13 in 2003. Since then, he led the team to additional large-margin wins of 55–17 in 2011 and 63–21 in 2012.

On July 11, 2007, Oklahoma was placed on probation for two years by the NCAA for a rules violation involving quarterback Rhett Bomar and offensive lineman JD Quinn, whom the university had previously suspended from the team due to the players' efforts to obtain payment for hours not worked. While the students who violated the rules were reinstated by the NCAA and allowed to play for other schools, the university, which had self-reported the violations, was initially directed to vacate all wins during the 2005–06 season, which included a 17–14 win over the University of Oregon in the Holiday Bowl. Oklahoma appealed the NCAA's ruling of a "failure to monitor" the employment of players in the program, as well as a reduction in scholarships and probation lasting until May, 2010. On February 22, 2008, the NCAA reversed part of the decision and reinstated the vacated wins.

Stoops' 2008 team went down in the history books as the highest scoring team in college football history, scoring a total of 716 points, averaging 51 points per game. Over five consecutive games, the Sooners scored 60 points or more, another record (in the game prior to the streak, the Sooners scored 58 points). After a four-week layoff, the offense was held in check against the nation's best defense of the Florida Gators in the National Championship game, scoring only 14 points and committing two turnovers near the Florida goal line. The Sooners were without one of their star offensive playmakers in DeMarco Murray, who sat out with an injury. However, the Sooners' 2008 defense, which was much maligned during the season for allowing a Stoops'-worst 25 points per game average, held the Florida Gators' high-powered Tim Tebow-led offense to only 24 points, 21 points below their season average.

Stoops' success at Oklahoma made him the frequent subject of head coach searches by NFL teams and college programs alike, which he repeatedly turned down. He was reportedly the top-paid coach in Division I-A football with annual compensation in excess of $3 million until Nick Saban was signed by the University of Alabama for $4 million per year in 2007. However, Stoops did receive a "longevity bonus" of $3 million at the end of the 2008 season (his 10th), making his annual salary in 2008 approximately $6.1 million (equivalent to $ million in ) .

In the 2012 season, he led the Sooners back to the top 25 and went to the Cotton Bowl, losing to Heisman Trophy-winning Johnny Manziel and the Texas A&M Aggies, 41–13. In his career at Oklahoma, several of Stoops' assistants became head coaches at other Division I-A programs, including his brother Mike Stoops (Arizona), Mark Mangino (Kansas), Mike Leach (Texas Tech, Washington State and Mississippi State), Chuck Long (San Diego State), Bo Pelini (Nebraska and Youngstown State), Kevin Sumlin (Texas A&M), Kevin Wilson (Indiana), and his eventual successor, Lincoln Riley (USC, Oklahoma).

Stoops is the only head coach in the BCS era to have won the Rose Bowl, Orange Bowl, Fiesta Bowl, and Sugar Bowl.

On June 7, 2017, Stoops announced his retirement from college coaching. He was succeeded by Lincoln Riley as Oklahoma's head football coach.

XFL
On February 7, 2019, Stoops announced his plans to come out of retirement, as he was named head coach/general manager of the upcoming Dallas Renegades in the XFL. He served in this role until the league ceased operations on April 14, 2020 due to bankruptcy stemming from the COVID-19 outbreak. On April 13, 2022, Stoops re-signed with the XFL.

Oklahoma (interim)
On November 28, 2021, Stoops was named interim head coach for Oklahoma's bowl game after Lincoln Riley took the USC Trojans head coaching job. The head coaching position was filled by former Stoops assistant Brent Venables. Stoops coached the Sooners in the 2021 Alamo Bowl; the Sooners won 47–32.

Personal life
Stoops is married to Carol Stoops, a Mary Kay National Sales Director. They have three children: a daughter, Mackenzie, who now attends the University of Oklahoma, and twin sons, Isaac and Drake. Drake Stoops plays wide receiver for the Oklahoma Sooners. Isaac Stoops has coached at the high school level as a wide receivers coach for Moore (OK) High School  and took a position as a volunteer analyst with the University of Oklahoma Sooners for the 2021-22 football season.

Stoops' younger brother, Mike, is the former defensive coordinator for the Sooners and was previously head football coach at the University of Arizona. He currently serves as inside linebackers coach for the football program of University of Kentucky. Another brother (the youngest), Mark, became the head coach at the University of Kentucky in November 2012. Stoops' older brother, Ron Jr., is an assistant football coach at Youngstown State University in Youngstown, Ohio.

Stoops remains close with Steve Spurrier, his mentor from the University of Florida.

Coaching tree
Head coaches under whom Stoops served:
Hayden Fry: Iowa (1983–1987)
Dick Crum: Kent State (1988)
Bill Snyder: Kansas State (1989–1995)
Steve Spurrier: Florida (1996–1998)

Assistant coaches under Stoops who became college or professional head coaches:

 Mike Leach: Texas Tech (2000–2009), Washington State (2012–2020), Mississippi State (2020–2022)
 Chuck Long: San Diego State (2006–2008)
 Mark Mangino: Kansas (2002–2009)
 Jay Norvell: Nevada (2017–2021), Colorado State (2022-Present) 
 Bo Pelini: Nebraska (2003, 2008–2014), Youngstown State (2015–2019)
 Mike Stoops: Arizona (2004–2011)
 Kevin Sumlin: Houston (2008–2011), Texas A&M (2012–2017), Arizona (2018–2020)
 Kevin Wilson: Indiana (2011–2016), Tulsa (2023-present)
 Lincoln Riley: Oklahoma (2017–2021), USC (2022–present)
 Josh Heupel: UCF (2018–2020), Tennessee (2021–present)
 Jonathan Hayes: St. Louis BattleHawks (2020)
 Brent Venables, Oklahoma (2022–present)
 Ryan Walters, Purdue (2023-present)

Head coaching record

College

XFL

References

External links
 Oklahoma profile
 
 

1960 births
Living people
Dallas Renegades coaches
Florida Gators football coaches
American football cornerbacks
Iowa Hawkeyes football players
Iowa Hawkeyes football coaches
Kansas State Wildcats football coaches
Oklahoma Sooners football coaches
College Football Hall of Fame inductees
Coaches of American football from Ohio
Players of American football from Youngstown, Ohio
Catholics from Ohio